The 2013 Saint Francis Cougars football team represented the University of Saint Francis, located in Fort Wayne, Indiana, in the 2013 NAIA football season. They were led by head coach Kevin Donley, who served his 16th year as the first and only head coach in the history of Saint Francis football.  The Cougars played their home games at Bishop John D'Arcy Stadium and were members of the Mid-States Football Association (MSFA) Mideast League (MEL). The Cougars finished 1st in the MSFA MEL division and received an automatic bid to participate in the postseason NAIA playoffs.

Schedule 
(9-3 overall, 5-1 conference)

Game summaries
9/14/2013 - The Cougars opened the season against a formidable opponent in William Penn.  The week prior, the Statesmen had opened their season with a convincing victory over then 9th-ranked Bethel (TN).  The lack of a poll after that week kept the Statesmen from a higher national ranking.  This game was tied 10-10 at the half.  But USF took control in the second half, aided by a game-ending injury to the Statesmen's starting quarterback.  The Cougars scored the last 21 points in the game.  For their effort on the week, the Cougars were elevated to #2 in the NAIA Coaches Poll.

9/21/2013 - The Cougars home opener was against St. Ambrose, a tough 7th-ranked team that gave the Cougars a 1-point loss last season.  The game's outcome wasn't certain until all time had expired from the clock.  After scoring a late 4th quarter touchdown, the Bees had a chance to kick for 1 point to tie the score at 38-38.  But the Bees opted instead to attempt a 2-point conversion.  An incomplete pass denied the Bees the lead at that time.  Later in the quarter, as time was running out, The Bees attempted a game-winning field goal.  But the kick sailed wide as the clock struck :00, and Saint Francis came away with a 1-point victory of their own, 38-37.  Next week, the Cougars return to the road to face their 3rd ranked opponent in 3 weeks when they visit #7 Grand View (IA).

9/28/2013 - The Cougars went on the road and fell to defeat against an impressive Grand View team, 23-7.  For their win, Grand View improved to #4 in the national polls, while Saint Francis dropped 4 places to #6.  The Cougars next opponent, Siena Heights (Mich.), entered the national polls for the first time, appearing at #25 in this week's rankings.

10/5/2013 - The Cougars went on the road to another tough ranked opponent.  The Cougars trailed 17-14 at halftime.  Under the leadership of quarterback David Yoder, who replaced an injured Josh Miller, the Cougars scored two touchdowns in the second half while holding Siena Heights scoreless to give them a 28-17 victory.  This was their first conference win of the season.

Ranking movements

References

Saint Francis
Saint Francis Cougars football seasons
Saint Francis Cougars football